Nguyễn Thị Bích Thùy (born 1 May 1994) is a Vietnamese footballer who plays as a midfielder for Women's Championship club Hồ Chí Minh City I and the Vietnam women's national team.

International goals
."'Scores and result are list Vietnam's goal tally first.

References

1994 births
Living people
Women's association football midfielders
Vietnamese women's footballers
Vietnam women's international footballers
Southeast Asian Games gold medalists for Vietnam
Southeast Asian Games medalists in football
Competitors at the 2017 Southeast Asian Games
21st-century Vietnamese women